Mereșeuca is a village in Ocnița District, Moldova.

References

Villages of Ocnița District
Populated places on the Dniester